The Trup Tindakan Cepat, or TTC, is an elite counter terrorism unit within the Malaysian Prison Department.

Formed on 3 October 2005, TTC Force is a highly trained elite force that is deployed for various high risk and special operations, such as responding to incidents, riots, cell extractions, mass searches, or disturbances in prisons, possibly involving uncooperative or violent inmates. The units are required to be contactable and able to respond at all times. TTC is founded upon a team concept and is made up of highly motivated and experienced officers

History

The TTC was formed after the hostage incidents at Pudu jails. The latter establishment was taken over by a Singaporean named Jimmy Chua and his henchmen, who captured the jail and took the staff and prisoners as a hostages.

The unit, which consists of 20 operators, under the command by Commissioner-General of Prisons, Dato' Mustafa Bin Osman, was established on 3 October 2005; it became operational in 2006. The team led by the Assistant Superintendent of Prisons, Yusli Bin Yusof, had undergone three months training at the Special Warfare Training Centre (PULPAK) in Sungai Udang Fort, Malacca. This training was conducted by the 11th Grup Gerak Khas Counter-Terrorist Regiment.

The Prisons Department are required to deploy such a unit because many high-profile criminals and terrorists are detained, including those under the Internal Security Act (ISA). This unit liaises with other agencies, including the Pasukan Gerakan Khas and Royal Malaysian Navy's PASKAL which are also involved in national security. The TTC duties include transport of high risk inmates, extracting uncooperative prisoners from their cells, daily full cell searches and high-profile security, barricaded persons, riots, mass arrest, high risk/high-profile transport and hostages situations, as well as crowd control.

The Prisons Department were originally accompanied by the police for escorting high-profile prisoners. Following the formation of the TTC, such moves could be carried out without police assistance.

Training

The Prisons Department plan to expand the TTC to 30 officers after a preliminary trial at their training centre. The selection process for suitable officers, is extremely tough. Potential officers of the TTC must be under 35 years old, has a good health and pass a qualification period. Throughout the process, officers must go through various physically demanding activities such as Individual physical proficiency tests or IPPT. They must also clear the standard obstacle course within a stipulated time. Teamwork must be evident among officers as well. They will be required to join a counter-terrorist course by the 69 Commando at the General Operations Force Training Centre, at Ulu Kinta.

Prospective trainees are expected to exceed the minimum requirements of the Physical Screening Test (PST) which are:

 A 3.2 km run in 18 minutes
 Seven chin-ups
 25 sit-ups in one minute
 25 push-ups in one minute
 The fireman's lift over 100 metres
 Swim 100 metres freestyle
 Diving into 15 metres of water
 Falling 10 metres
 Treading water for five minutes
 Climbing a six-metre rope
 A firing skills test
 A writing test

TTC officers are specialised in multiple areas, which are essential to make prisons safe in an ever-changing security climate, such as:

Combat Techniques
 Close-quarters riot control
 Transportation of high risk inmates
 Close protection
 Less lethal weaponry
 Dynamic entry
 Physical training
 Use of specialised weapons
 Tactical rappelling
 Close Quarters Combat
 Unarmed combat (including Taekwondo martial arts)
 Marksmanship
 Tactical shooting

Task Oriented
 Combat Search and Rescue (CSAR)
 Explosive Ordnance Disposal (EOD) handling
 Hostage rescue, internal and external, and in vehicles

Intelligence Gathering
 Intelligence
 Special reconnaissance
 Disguises

Their core functions include responding to prison contingencies and exercises, performing high risk escort duties and training prison officers in various core tactical skills.

In March 2010, the second series of TTC selection was attended by 32 trainees, only 18 personnel passed a 15-week course at the Prison Officer Training Centre, Taiping, Perak. The Best Intern was PW 14319 Mazlan Bin Abd. Razak from Bentong Prison. The Best at Shooting was PW 14450 Hj Majidee Bin Hj. Khalid from Miri Prisons and the Best at Physical Training was PW 14430 Mahadi Bin Mamat from Kajang Prison.

Firearms
Like other specialist teams, the TTC is equipped with special weapons and equipment such as pistols, shotguns and SMG. TTC members have access to battering rams and tools for forced entry along with other weaponry including rifles, machine guns, grenade launchers and sniper rifles depend on the situation encountered. Weapons chosen possibility is:

Pistols
 : Glock 17
 : Smith & Wesson M&P

Shotguns
 : Remington 870
 : Benelli Nova

Sub-machine guns
 : CZ Scorpion Evo 3
 : Heckler & Koch MP5

Grenade launcher T.S Gun
 : CS Mk.IV

Precision rifles
 : Accuracy International PM

Support Equipment
 : Taser X26
 : Night vision devices
 : T-baton - Made by Pro Squad Defence, including laser dot and LED flashlight
 : Tactical Vest - Made by Blackhawk
 : Ballistic helmet
 : Tactical shield
 : Thunderbolt Mono Shock Ram

See also
 Singapore Prisons Emergency Action Response
 Correctional Emergency Response Team

References

External links
 Websites of Malaysian Prison Department

2005 establishments in Malaysia
Specialist law enforcement agencies of Malaysia
Organizations established in 2005
Prisons in Malaysia
Non-military counterterrorist organizations